Melitopol Raion is one of the five raions (districts) of Zaporizhzhia Oblast in southern Ukraine under occupation by Russia. The administrative center of the region is Melitopol. Population: .

On 18 July 2020, as part of the administrative reform of Ukraine, the number of raions of Zaporizhzhia Oblast was reduced to five, and the area of Melitopol Raion was significantly expanded.

References

Raions of Zaporizhzhia Oblast
1930 establishments in Ukraine